The Gnathiidae are a family of isopod crustaceans. They occur in a wide range of depths, from the littoral zone to the deep sea. The adults are associated with sponges and may not feed. The juvenile form is known as a 'praniza', and it is a temporary parasite of marine fish. These forms are not larvae; Gnathiidae instead become parasitic during the manca stage. Mancae of the Gnathiidae closely resemble the adult form, however they lack the final pair of pereiopods. 

Taxonomy in the family relies on male characters, such that females and juveniles cannot be reliably identified. The family contains 182 species, divided among the following genera:

Afrignathia Hadfield & Smit, 2008
Bathygnathia Dollfus, 1901
Bythognathia Camp, 1988
Caecognathia Dollfus, 1901
Elaphognathia Monod, 1926
Euneognathia Stebbing, 1893
Gibbagnathia Cohen & Poore, 1994
Gnathia Leach, 1814
Monodgnathia Cohen & Poore, 1994
Paragnathia Omer-Cooper & Omer-Cooper, 1916
Tenerognathia Tanaka, 2005
Thaumastognathia Monod, 1926

References

External links 
Gnathiidae Australian Isopoda

Cymothoida
Taxa named by William Elford Leach
Parasitic crustaceans
Crustacean families